Strathmore Station is a pastoral lease that operates as a cattle station in Queensland. The station is the largest single pastoral lease in the state.

Geography 

It is capable of carrying over 50,000 head of cattle and is currently running Droughtmaster-Brahman cross breeders.

History 
In 1929 the state owned Strathmore was put up for auction and sold for £25,000 to T. Sanderson of Melbourne.

Prior to 1953 Messrs Gilchrist, Watt and Cunningham made the decision to convert the entire herd at Strathmore of 20,000 breeders to poll shorthorns. Bulls from Strathmore commanded record prices in 1953. The owner of the property in 2012 was Scott Harris. Harris lost 860 cattle the same year from cattle duffers who stole the stock while he was attending his own wedding. 

Harris was granted a permit to clear and cultivate a  portion of the property to cultivate with sorghum using a water allocation from the Gilbert River.

See also
List of ranches and stations
List of the largest stations in Australia

References

 
Pastoral leases in Queensland 
Stations (Australian agriculture)
North West Queensland